Note: This ship should not be confused with the fourth  or fifth , which were in commission at the same time.

The third USS Resolute (SP-1309) was a tug that served in the United States Navy from 1918 to 1919.

Resolute, was built as the commercial wooden-hulled salvage tug SS Sarah E. McWilliams during 1916 by Great Lakes Engineering Company at Ashtabula, Ohio.  She had been renamed SS Resolute by the time the U.S. Navy purchased her for World War I service from her owner, Merritt and Chapman Company of New York City on 8 August 1918. She was commissioned on 10 September 1918 as USS Resolute (SP-1309).

Resolute was based at the Central District Salvage Station at Stapleton on Staten Island, New York, throughout her U.S. Navy career. She performed local towing duty, took part in several salvage operations, and assisted in patrolling the local anchorages.

Decommissioned on 15 May 1919, Resolute was sold to her former owner the same day and returned to mercantile service. She remained in mercantile service until scrapped in 1955.

During early 1942 Resolute again served the U.S. Navy, operating for several months as a commercial tug under a charter to perform salvage work on the United States East Coast.

References
 
 NavSource Online: Section Patrol Craft Photo Archive Resolute (SP 1309)

World War I patrol vessels of the United States
Tugs of the United States Navy
 Ashtabula
1916 ships